is a Japanese football player. He plays for Montedio Yamagata.

Career
Shintaro Kokubu joined J2 League club Oita Trinita in 2017.

Club statistics
Updated to 28 July 2022.

References

External links

Profile at Oita Trinita

1994 births
Living people
Ritsumeikan University alumni
Association football people from Okayama Prefecture
Japanese footballers
J2 League players
J3 League players
Oita Trinita players
Giravanz Kitakyushu players
Association football midfielders